Mix of Life is a remix album, the fourth album released by ZOEgirl, featuring songs from Life, as well as their self-titled album.

Track listing

Chart performance

No. 2 - Billboard Electronic
No. 15 - Billboard Heatseekers
No. 23 - Billboard Contemporary Christian

References 

ZOEgirl albums
2002 remix albums
Sparrow Records remix albums